Yehudah Leopold Werner (born 1931 in Munich) is an Israeli herpetologist and Professor Emeritus at the Alexander Silberman Institute of Life Sciences, the Hebrew University of Jerusalem (Department of Evolution, Systematics and Ecology).

He and his parents were forced to flee from Nazi Germany in 1933, and reached Palestine via France and England in 1935. Georg Haas (1905–1981), an emigrant from Austria who was Professor in Jerusalem, guided his PhD at the Hebrew University of Jerusalem. During his long scientific career, Werner published more than 400 titles. Among other things, the biology of the geckos, including
their vocal communication, as well as the zoogeography and conservation of the reptiles and amphibians in the Middle East are his main themes. Werner was a co-founder of the Society for the Protection of Nature in Israel and served as chairperson of the Zoological Society of Israel.

Taxa described by Yehudah Werner
Yehudah Werner described or redescribed (alone or with co-authors) a number of amphibian and reptile taxa:

 Hyla heinzsteinitzi Grach, Plesser & Werner, 2007 (this species is a synonym of H. japonica that has been apparently introduced into Israel, see Molecular Phylogenetics and Evolution 49: 1019–1024.)
 Acanthodactylus ahmaddisii Werner, 2004
 Acanthodactylus beershebensis Moravec, Baha El Din, Seligmann, Sivan & Werner, 1999
 Acanthodactylus pardalis (Lichtenstein, 1823) Moravec, Baha El Din, Seligmann, Sivan & Werner, 1999
 Asaccus nasrullahi Werner, 2006
 Mesalina bahaeldini Segoli, Cohen & Werner, 2002
 Micrelaps tchernovi Werner, Babocsay, Carmely & Thuna, 2006
 Ptyodactylus hasselquistii krameri Werner, 1995
 
Note: Amphibian and reptile taxa with the author's name "Werner" described between 1893 and 1938 are by the Austrian zoologist Franz Werner.

Taxa named in honor of Yehudah Werner
Yehudah Werner is commemorated in the scientific names of two reptiles:

Testudo werneri Perälä, 2001
Pseudotrapelus sinaitus werneri Moravec, 2002

References

External links
 Yehudah Leopold Werner: General Information, Curriculum Vitae, Publications
  Article with photos of Hyla heinzsteinitzi and Yehudah L. Werner

1931 births
Israeli herpetologists
Academic staff of the Hebrew University of Jerusalem
Living people
Jewish emigrants from Nazi Germany to Mandatory Palestine